The 2021 FIBA European Championship for Small Countries was the 17th edition of this tournament, hosted in Dublin, Ireland. Initially, the championship was postponed and then cancelled due to the coronavirus disease 2019 (COVID-19) pandemic. It took place instead from 10 to 15 August 2021.

The title was won by Ireland for the second time.

Teams
Moldova and Norway did not join this edition. They were replaced by Armenia, winners in 2016 which was about to comeback to competition after its withdrawal from the EuroBasket 2021 pre-qualifiers, and Azerbaijan, winners in 2006 and 2008, which was set for a comeback to competition since its participation in the EuroBasket 2013 qualification.

Due to the postponement of the tournament to 2021, Armenia and Azerbaijan withdrew from participating in the tournament.

Results

All times are local (UTC+1).

References

External links
 The Championship at FIBA.com

FIBA European Championship for Small Countries
FIBA European Championship for Small Countries
FIBA European Championship for Small Countries
2021 in Irish sport
Basketball competitions in Ireland
International sports competitions hosted by Ireland
FIBA European Championship for Small Countries
FIBA
International sports competitions in Dublin (city)